Epineri Taganesei Naituku (8 January 1963 – 29 October 2019) was a Fijian rugby union player. He played as centre.

Career
He was capped for Fiji twice, in the 1987 Rugby World Cup, playing the matches against Argentina, on 24 May, at Hamilton and Italy, on 31 May, at Dunedin, the latter of which was his last international cap.
Naituku also played for the South Sea Barbarians, a team made up of Fijian, Samoan and Tongan players, which played a rebel tour in apartheid-era South Africa.

Notes

External links
 Epineri Naituku international statistics

1963 births
2019 deaths
Fiji international rugby union players
Fijian rugby union players
I-Taukei Fijian people
Rugby union centres